The College Football Playoff (CFP) is an annual postseason knockout invitational tournament to determine a national champion for the National Collegiate Athletic Association (NCAA) Division I Football Bowl Subdivision (FBS), the highest level of college football competition in the United States. Four teams play in two semifinal games, and the winner of each semifinal advances to the College Football Playoff National Championship game.

The inaugural tournament was held at the end of the 2014 NCAA Division I FBS football season and was won by Ohio State, who defeated Oregon in the championship game with their third-string quarterback. After the first season, the playoff has been largely dominated by Alabama and Clemson; they have faced each other in the championship game three times and also played once in the semifinals.

A 13-member committee selects and seeds the four teams to take part in the CFP. This system differs from the use of polls or computer rankings that had previously been used to select the participants for the Bowl Championship Series (BCS), the title system used in FBS from 1998 to 2013. The current format is a Plus-One system, an idea which became popular as an alternative to the BCS after the 2003 and 2004 seasons ended in controversy.

The two semifinal games rotate among six major bowl games, referred to as the New Year's Six: the Cotton Bowl, Fiesta Bowl, Orange Bowl, Peach Bowl, Rose Bowl, and Sugar Bowl. In addition to the four teams selected for the playoff, the final CFP rankings are used in determining the participants for the four New Year's Six bowls that are not hosting the semifinals that year. If the Rose and Sugar Bowls host the semifinals (which occurs every third year), they are played on New Year's Day (or January 2 should New Year's Day fall on a Sunday). In other years, they are scheduled on a Friday or Saturday near New Year's Day, with flexibility allowed to ensure that they are not in conflict with other bowl games traditionally held on New Year's Day.  The two semifinal games are always played on the same day. The College Football Playoff National Championship game is then played on the first Monday that is 6 or more days after the Semifinals.

The venue of the championship game is selected based on bids submitted by cities, similar to the Super Bowl or NCAA Final Four.

The winner of the Championship Game is awarded the College Football Playoff National Championship Trophy. Playoff officials commissioned a new trophy that was unconnected with the previous championship systems, such as the AFCA "crystal football" trophy which had been regularly presented after the championship game since the 1990s (as the AFCA was contractually obligated to name the BCS champion as the Coaches Poll champion).

As the NCAA does not organize or award an official national championship for FBS football (instead merely recognizing the decisions made by any of a number of independent major championship selectors), the CFP's inception in 2014 marked the first time a major national championship selector in college football was able to determine their champion by using a bracket competition.

The College Football Playoff will expand to include twelve teams for the 2024 season.

Selection process

Selection committee
The first College Football Playoff selection committee was announced on October 16, 2013. The group consists of 13 members who generally serve three-year terms, although some initial selections served two- and four-year terms "to achieve a rotation" of members.

, the members of the selection committee are:

The committee members include one current athletic director from each of the five "major" conferences—ACC, Big Ten, Big 12, Pac-12, and SEC—also known as the Power Five conferences. Other members are former coaches, players, athletic directors, and administrators, plus a retired member of the media. The goal was for the panel to consist proportionally of current "Power Five" athletic directors, former coaches, and a third group of other voters, excluding current conference commissioners, coaches, and media members. During the selection process, organizers said they wanted the committee to be geographically balanced. Conference commissioners submitted lists totaling more than 100 names from which to select the final committee members.

Past members

The selection of Condoleezza Rice, a former U.S. Secretary of State and Stanford University provost, was met with some backlash within the sport and the media. Critics questioned her qualifications, citing gender and lack of football experience.

Voting procedure
The committee releases its top 25 rankings weekly on Tuesdays in the second half of the regular season. The top four teams are seeded in that order for the playoff. During the season, the committee meets and releases rankings six or seven times, depending on the length of the season (the number of games is consistent, but the number of weeks those games are played over can vary from year to year). The group, which meets at the Gaylord Texan hotel in Grapevine, Texas, reportedly meets in person up to 10 total times a year.

A team's strength of schedule is one of the most pertinent considerations for the committee in making its selections. Other factors that the committee weighs are conference championships, team records, and head-to-head results, plus other points such as injuries and weather. Unlike the BCS system, the AP Poll, Coaches' Poll, and the Harris Poll, computer rankings are not used to make the selections. Advanced statistics and metrics are expected to be submitted to the committee, though like other analytics, they have no formal role in the decision. Committee members are not required to attend games.

Long said the panel considered less frequent rankings, but ultimately decided on a weekly release. "That's what the fans have become accustomed to, and we felt it would leave a void in college football without a ranking for several weeks," he said. Long also noted: "Early on there was some talk that we would go into a room at the end of the season and come out with a top four, but that didn't last long." In analyzing this change in thinking, Stewart Mandel of Sports Illustrated commented: "The whole point of the selection committee was to replace the simplistic horse-race nature of Top 25 polls – where teams only move up if someone above them loses – with a more deliberative evaluation method. Now the playoff folks are going to try to do both." Addressing the "pecking order" nature of traditional polls, George Schrodeder of USA Today wrote that "if it actually works as intended, we could see volatile swings" from week to week, with lower-ranked teams moving ahead of higher-ranked teams without either team losing (a rarity in traditional polls). Both Long and Bill Hancock, the CFP executive director, say they expect that to happen.

The committee's voting method uses multiple ballots, similar to the NCAA basketball tournament selection process and the entire process is facilitated through custom software developed by Code Authority in Frisco, Texas. From a large initial pool of teams, the group takes numerous votes on successive tiers of teams, considering six at a time and coming to a consensus on how they should be ranked, then repeating the process with the next tier of teams. Discussion and debate happens at each voting step. All votes are by secret ballot, and committee members do not make their ballots public. Each week's ranking process begins anew, with no weight given to the previous week's selections. In this fashion, the committee selects the four teams to compete for the national championship.

Committee members who are currently employed or financially compensated by a school, or have family members who have a current financial relationship (which includes football players), are not allowed to vote for that school. During deliberations about a team's selection, members with such a conflict of interest cannot be present, but can answer factual questions about the institution. All committee members have past ties to certain NCAA institutions, but the committee decided to ignore those ties in the recusal requirements. "We just boiled it down to where we felt this group was fit to its high integrity and would differentiate from those past relationships," Long said. Some football writers, like Dennis Dodd and Mark Schlabach, have said the recusal arrangement isn't transparent or objective, suggesting that members' alma maters and former coaching jobs should be considered disqualifying conflicts of interest.

Selections by year

To date, 28 of the 36 teams selected for the College Football Playoff have been undefeated or 1-loss conference champions from Power Five conferences. Three 1-loss Power Five teams have been selected without playing in their conference championship game, and three others have been selected after losing their respective conference championship games. One undefeated independent team has been selected, and one undefeated conference champion from a Group of Five conference has been selected. No teams with two or more losses have been selected.

Impact on scheduling

Due to the increased emphasis on strength of schedule, teams have considered playing more challenging opponents during the non-conference portion of their schedules. Some teams have traditionally played three or four "weak" non-conference opponents, but wins against such low-level competition are unlikely to impress the committee. For teams on the cusp of making the playoff four, "I think one of the first things the committee will look at is strength of schedule," said selector Oliver Luck.

Teams in the Big Ten, Big 12 and Pac-12 play nine conference games on their twelve-game schedules and thus only have flexibility in choosing their opponents for the three non-league games. Some programs are opting to increase their schedule strength by scheduling high-profile matchups at neutral sites and on weeknights, garnering primetime TV exclusivity.

In response to the new playoff system, the Southeastern Conference considered increasing its conference schedule from eight to nine games, with Alabama coach Nick Saban a vocal proponent. According to Jon Solomon of the Birmingham News, "The prevailing opinion among SEC athletics directors: The SEC is difficult enough that there's no need for a ninth game." Some in the conference, like Mississippi State athletic director Scott Stricklin, expressed the opinion that a nine-game SEC schedule would result in more teams with two losses. Commissioner Michael Slive and Vanderbilt AD David Williams, among others, supported a stronger out-of-league schedule, which would likely impress the committee. In April 2014, the league voted to mandate that all SEC teams must play a Power Five foe (ACC, Big Ten, Big 12, Pac-12, or independent Notre Dame) in its non-conference slate beginning in 2016. Slive noted this rule "gives us the added strength-of-schedule we were seeking". In 2014, the first year of the College Football Playoff, one team (Georgia) played two opponents from the Power Five, nine of the 14 teams played one Power Five conference opponent and three lower-level opponents (including one FCS school), and four teams did not face a Power Five foe.  In the spring of 2015, the SEC decided to count games played against Independents BYU and Army toward its Power Five requirement.

The ACC, whose teams also play eight conference games (plus Notre Dame at least once every three years), also considered moving to a nine-game conference schedule. However, the league opted to stay with the eight-plus-Notre Dame model, stipulating instead that teams would have to play one Power Five school in their non-league slates beginning in 2017, which would include the Notre Dame game or other ACC schools, as will games against another FBS independent, BYU. Despite the push to increase schedule strength, some ACC coaches preferred the scheduling flexibility available with fewer permanent fixtures on a team's slate. Opinion was split among league athletic directors on moving to a nine-game schedule prior to the vote. An SEC expansion to a nine-game schedule would limit the ACC's opportunities to play Power Five non-conference opponents.

Semifinals

The College Football Playoff uses a four-team knockout bracket to determine the national champion. Six bowl games—the Rose Bowl, Sugar Bowl, Orange Bowl, Cotton Bowl, Fiesta Bowl, and Peach Bowl– rotate as hosts for the semifinals.  The rotation is set on a three-year cycle with the following pairings: Rose/Sugar, Orange/Cotton, and Fiesta/Peach. The two semifinal bowls and the other four top-tier bowls are marketed as the New Year's Six. As of the 2024-25 season when the playoff expends to 12 teams those not hosting semifinals will host quarterfinals. Per contract, the Rose & Sugar Bowls are always on New Year's Day. Originally 3 games were held on New Year's Eve with the other 3 on New Year's Day, however disappointing TV ratings in the first rotation led to games originally planned for New Year's Eve be moved to as early as December 27 in some years. The selection committee seeds the top four teams, and also assigns teams to the at-large bowls (Cotton, Fiesta, and Peach) in years when they do not host semifinals.

The four-team format pits the No. 1-ranked team against No. 4 and No. 2 against No. 3. The seeding determines the semifinal bowl game assigned to each matchup; the No. 1 seed chooses its bowl game to prevent it from playing in a "road" environment. There are no limits on the number of teams per conference, a change from previous BCS rules. However, some non-semifinal bowl selections still maintain their conference tie-ins, similarly to the BCS's automatic qualifier berths. A team from one of the "Group of Five" conferences is guaranteed a spot in one of the New Year's Six bowls.

Championship game

Cities around the country bid to host each year's championship game. The playoff group's leaders make a selection from those proposals, in a similar fashion to other large sporting events, such as the Super Bowl or NCAA Final Four. Officials say the championship game will be held in a different city each year, and that bids must propose host stadiums with a capacity of at least 65,000 spectators. Under the system, cities cannot host both a semifinal game and the title game in the same year.

Appearances

Appearances by team

Appearances by conference

Broadcasting
In 2013, the television broadcast rights to all six CFP bowls and the National Championship were acquired by ESPN through at least the 2025 season. ESPN then reached 12-year agreements to retain rights to the Rose Bowl, Orange Bowl, and Sugar Bowl following the dissolution of the Bowl Championship Series. In November of that year, ESPN reached a 12-year deal to broadcast the remaining three bowls, the championship game, as well as shoulder programming such as ranking shows. As a whole, the contract is valued at around $470 million per year, or nearly $5.7 billion for the life of the contract.

Ratings
The inaugural College Football Playoff games in January 2015 generated larger ratings than previous BCS games. The 2015 College Football Playoff National Championship had an 18.9 Nielsen rating and was watched by approximately 33.4 million people, the largest broadcast audience of all time on American cable television (non-broadcast), according to AdWeek. That was a 31 percent audience increase over the previous year's championship game and a 22 percent increase over the BCS title game's best rating on cable (a 16.1 rating in 2011). The semifinal games, the 2015 Rose Bowl and 2015 Sugar Bowl, saw 28.16 million and 28.27 million viewers, respectively. According to ESPN, these games also set (and briefly held) all-time records for cable TV viewership.

In 2015, the ratings for the two semifinal games were down from the prior season's equivalents, with the Orange Bowl reaching a 9.7 rating (in comparison to 15.5 for the 2015 Rose Bowl) and the Cotton Bowl reaching a 9.9 rating (in comparison to a 15.3 rating for the 2015 Sugar Bowl). On the online WatchESPN streaming service, excluding 2014 FIFA World Cup games, the Cotton Bowl and the Orange Bowl drew the second and third-largest streaming audiences in the service's history, behind the 2015 national championship. The ratings drops were attributed to the New Year's Eve time slot, as fewer people were at home to watch the game. The decline in ratings was a factor in changes for the scheduling of future CFP semi-final games.

Revenue
In 2012, ESPN reportedly agreed to pay about $7.3 billion over 12 years for broadcasting rights to all seven games, an average of about $608 million per year. That includes $215 million per year which was already committed to the Rose, Sugar and Orange bowls, plus $470–475 million annually for the rest of the package. By comparison, the most recent contract with the BCS and the Rose Bowl had paid approximately $155 million per year for five games.

The average revenue to the new system over 12 years is to be about $500 million per year. After $125–150 million in expenses, the Power Five conferences split about 71.5 percent of the remaining money, for an approximate average payout of $250 million a year ($50 million per league) over the life of the contract. The "Group of Five" conferences split 27 percent, about $90 million a year ($18 million per league). Notre Dame receives around one percent, about $3.5-4 million, and other FBS independents get about 0.5 percent of the deal.

Extra revenue goes to conferences in contracts with the Rose, Sugar, and Orange bowls, which split revenue 50/50 between their participating leagues. In non-semifinal years, the Rose Bowl's TV revenue would be divided between the Big Ten and Pac-12 conferences; likewise, the Sugar Bowl and Orange Bowl revenue to its participant conferences. When those bowls are semifinal games, the money is distributed by the playoff system to all FBS conferences. ESPN has paid about $80 million a year each for the Rose and Sugar bowls over 12 years. The Orange Bowl deal is worth $55 million per year. For example, in a non-semifinal year, the Big Ten could receive about $90 million (half of its $80 million Rose Bowl deal plus about $50 million from the playoff system).

Conferences receive an additional $6 million each year for each team it places in the semifinals and $4 million for a team in one of the three at-large bowls; Notre Dame receives the same amount in either scenario. No additional money is awarded for reaching the championship game.

The Power Five conferences and the "Group of Five" have not decided on their respective revenue-sharing formulas, though the SEC initially receives more revenue than the other four Power Five conferences due to its BCS success. Reports say the money is to be divided based on several criteria such as "on-field success, teams' expenses, marketplace factors and academic performance of student-athletes". The playoff system awards academic performance bonuses of $300,000 per school for meeting the NCAA's Academic Progress Rate standard of 930. In a hypothetical 14-team conference, $4.2 million ($300,000 x 14) would be allocated to that league, and if only 12 of the 14 members meet the APR standard, then each of the 12 schools would receive $350,000 ($4.2 million / 12), penalizing schools that fall below the threshold.

Leadership
BCS Properties, LLC holds all properties related to the College Football Playoff. Previous BCS commissioner Bill Hancock is the executive director of the playoff organization, with former SEC Assistant Commissioner for Championships Byron Hatch as COO. Like the BCS, the playoff system's management committee consists of the conference commissioners from the 10 FBS conferences and Notre Dame's athletic director. The playoff system's headquarters is in Irving, Texas.

Board of Managers
According to the CFP website, the system's operations are controlled by the Board of Managers, which consists of presidents and chancellors of the playoff group's member universities. The eleven members have sole authority to develop, review and approve annual budgets, policies and operating guidelines. The group also selects the company's officers.

 Eric Barron – President, Penn State (Big Ten)
 Rodney Bennett – President, Southern Miss (C-USA)
 Joe Castro – Chancellor, California State University; former president, Fresno State (Mountain West)
 Gordon Gee – President, West Virginia (Big 12)
 Jack Hawkins – Chancellor, Troy (Sun Belt)
 Rev. John I. Jenkins – President, Notre Dame (Independent)
 Mark Keenum – President, Mississippi State (SEC)
 Kirk Schulz – President, Washington State (Pac-12)
 John Thrasher – President, Florida State (ACC)
 Satish Tripathi – President, Buffalo (MAC)
 R. Gerald Turner – President, SMU (The American)

Athletics Directors Advisory Group
According to the CFP website, the Athletics Directors Advisory Group is appointed by the management committee to "offer counsel" on the operations of the system. As an advisory board, it has no authority in the management of the CFP.

 Gary Barta, Iowa (Big Ten)
 Tom Bowen, Memphis (The American)
 Tom Burman, Wyoming (Mountain West)
 Joe Castiglione, Oklahoma (Big 12)
 Jeremy Foley, Florida (SEC)
 Dan Guerrero, UCLA (Pac-12)
 Chris Massaro, Middle Tennessee (C-USA)
 Terry Mohajir, UCF (The American)
 Mike O'Brien, Toledo (MAC)
 Stan Wilcox, Florida State (ACC)

Criticism
Although being generally well received, the College Football Playoff has been criticized much like its predecessor, the Bowl Championship Series, which had several controversies.

Team selection

Because the tournament has four teams, at least one Power Five champion misses the playoffs every season. However, not all teams selected have been conference winners. In the 2016–17 season, and again in the 2022-23 season, one of the teams selected was Ohio State, who did not qualify for the Big Ten Championship Game in either season. As a result, in 2016 both the Big Ten and Big 12 champions were not selected for the playoffs (although both teams had two losses while Ohio State only had one), while in 2022 the undefeated Big Ten champion Michigan, who defeated Ohio State during regular season play, was included. In the 2017–18 season and 2021-22 season, two of the four selected teams were from the SEC: conference champions Alabama (in 2017) and Georgia (in 2021), both of whom had lost in 2017 to SEC runner-up Auburn in the regular season (though Georgia later soundly defeated Auburn in the SEC championship game), and the 2022 College Football Playoff National Championship Game being a rematch of the 2021 SEC Championship Game held a few weeks prior due to the committee's seeding. Some analysts have discussed whether the committee should select conference champions only.

Another critique centered around a perceived bias against smaller conferences such as the Big 12 which used to not stage a conference championship game, but reintroduced one for the 2017 season. The American Athletic Conference addressed this issue by enlisting Navy to its ranks for 2015, bringing its membership to 12 teams, which allowed it to stage a conference championship game under then-current NCAA rules. Since the 2016 season, FBS conferences have been allowed to stage football championship games even if they do not have 12 members.

There are opinions labeling the CFP system "just as" or "even more polarizing" than the BCS or the old wire-service poll system. However, most in sports media believe the College Football Playoff Committee got the right foursome for the 2017-18 playoff inasmuch as it included Alabama, a one-loss team excluded from its conference championship on a tiebreaker, instead of Ohio State, a two-loss conference champion. 

In 2019, Urban Meyer, head coach of the national champion 2014 Ohio State Buckeyes football team, said that he intentionally ran up the score against Wisconsin in the Big Ten Championship Game to help his team be chosen for the playoff. Criticizing the subjectivity of the selection process, Meyer said that he left the starting lineup in the game despite Ohio State being ahead 45–0 in the third quarter—not resting the starters and risking their health, and poor sportsmanship—because "I don't think the 'eye test' and 'people think' is going to get enough to bump TCU and Baylor". He continued, "I had a job to do, and that was to get Ohio State in the playoff. Do I think that's right? That's wrong", proposing a selection system based on defined criteria.

Late in the 2020 season, which was heavily impacted by the COVID-19 pandemic, Sports Illustrated writer Pat Forde was strongly critical of the CFP committee for what he considered unfair treatment of teams outside the Power Five. Forde noted that the CFP rankings released on December 8 saw Iowa State, then 8–2 (though having clinched a spot in the Big 12 Championship Game), ranked No. 7, one spot ahead of the top Group of Five team, then-unbeaten Cincinnati. Forde was especially rankled by Iowa State being ranked 12 spots ahead of Louisiana—a team whose only loss to that point had been to unbeaten Coastal Carolina, on a last-second field goal, and had also beaten Iowa State by 17 points. Louisiana's win was one of three by Sun Belt Conference teams against Big 12 teams in as many games in 2020, with Coastal Carolina also having such a win. Forde was even more critical of the committee the following week, saying "They doubled down on the favoritism [toward Power Five teams] this week." Iowa State moved up one place to No. 6 despite not playing the previous weekend, and Florida dropped only one place despite losing at home to 3–5 LSU. Meanwhile, idle Cincinnati dropped one spot, placing it behind three two-loss teams. Coastal Carolina, still unbeaten, was also ranked well behind Iowa State (at No. 12). CFP committee chair Gary Barta, in a media teleconference, cited a last-second Coastal Carolina win over Troy that weekend as one reason for their arguably low ranking; Forde pointed out that a month earlier, Iowa State had a similarly close win against Baylor, who finished the season at 2–7. Michael Aresco, commissioner of Cincinnati's American Athletic Conference, had equally pointed criticism, accusing the committee of "undermining its credibility with rankings that defy logic and common sense and fairness," and added, "I never thought I'd say it, but if this continues, bring back the BCS and the computers because it would be a fairer system than what I'm seeing now. This is the seventh year [of the CFP], and it does appear the deck is stacked against us and against other [Group of 5 teams]." No Group of Five team was ranked in the CFP top four until Cincinnati was fourth in the rankings released on November 23, 2021.

Selection committee
The qualifications of selection committee members has also been scrutinized. As an outsider to the sports world, Condoleezza Rice's selection was the focus of some criticism. Former Clemson head coach Tommy Bowden expressed the opinion that the committee's members should be "people who played the game and preferably coached the game".  Former Auburn head coach Pat Dye said that "All she knows about football is what somebody told her ... or what she read in a book, or what she saw on television. To understand football, you've got to play with your hand in the dirt".  Former Big East commissioner Mike Tranghese also gained membership on the selection committee despite having never played football in college. Former sportswriter Steve Weiberg and retired U.S. Air Force General Michael Gould are other committee members without significant football playing, coaching, or administrative experience.

Scheduling
The semifinal games for the 2015 season were scheduled for December 31; they were expected to have lower television viewership because the date is not a federal holiday, and because the second game faced heavy competition for television viewers in primetime from New Year's Eve specials (such as New Year's Rockin' Eve, which is aired by ESPN's sister broadcast network ABC). Under television contracts with ESPN that predate the College Football Playoff, both the Rose and Sugar Bowl games are guaranteed exclusive TV time slots on January 1 (or January 2 if New Year's Day falls on a Sunday), regardless of whether they are hosting a semifinal game.  In an interview with CBS Sports, CFP commissioner Bill Hancock suggested this scheduling issue would "change the paradigm of what New Year's Eve is all about," opining that "if you're hosting a New Year's Eve party, you better have a bunch of televisions around". Although ESPN proposed moving the Thursday, December 31, 2015 semifinal games to Saturday, January 2, 2016, the idea was rejected. The semifinal games' ratings were ultimately down significantly from those of the previous season.

In an effort to reduce the impact of their New Year's Eve scheduling, the 2016 semifinal games, which fell on a Saturday, had earlier kickoff times, at 3:00 p.m. and 7:00 p.m. ET respectively. The 2016 Orange Bowl was played in primetime on December 30, 2016, rather than in an early afternoon window on New Year's Eve. Hancock considered the earlier start times to be a compromise to reduce the games' intrusion into New Year's Eve festivities, but reiterated that there were no plans to move the semi-final games from New Year's Eve outside of years where they are hosted by the Rose Bowl and Sugar Bowl.

On July 28, 2016, however, Hancock reversed this stance and announced revisions to the scheduling for future College Football Playoff semi-final games. The games were rescheduled so that they will not necessarily be played on New Year's Eve yearly: outside of years when they are hosted by the Rose and Sugar Bowls (where they retain their traditional New Year's Day scheduling), they will now be scheduled primarily on the last Saturday or federally observed holiday of the year. In some years, this date will land on New Year's Eve. In 2021, the games were played on Friday, December 31, because the day was observed as a holiday. Viewership of the 2018 semi-finals were down by 25% over the previous semi-finals, which were played on New Year's Day.

Eight-team playoff proposal
A common suggestion before the planned expansion to twelve teams in 2024 was for the playoff to expand to an eight-team format, guaranteeing all five major conference champions a spot along with the highest ranked "Group of Five" champion. The remaining two spots would have been at-large selections awarded to the next two highest ranking teams. The seed pairings would have been ordered to fit the playoff format, with 1 vs. 8, 2 vs. 7, etc.

NCAA coaches were polled in 2014 and asked if they were in favor of a larger playoff system. More than half of the coaches (53 percent) from the Power 5 conferences who voted chose an eight-team playoff, compared to 33 percent for the four-team model. CFP executive director Bill Hancock said at the time that his group was committed to only four teams for the length of the 12-year contract through 2026, and "there has been no discussion of expanding".

Expansion efforts 
In June 2021, the CFP announced that it would begin studying an expansion to a 12-team playoff. The CFP stated that the starting time of any new format would only be determined after it had been approved.

On February 18, 2022, the CFP rejected the playoff proposal, pushing implementation of any changes to the playoff pool to no sooner than the 2026 season; however, the decision was reversed on September 2, 2022, when the CFP Board of Managers unanimously voted to expand the playoffs to 12 teams, with the earliest possible change happening in the 2024 season.

Conferences and bowls negotiated early expansion for several months during the fall of 2022. A potential sticking point was the Rose Bowl, which desired to keep its exclusive 5 PM ET kickoff time on January 1, even during years it will host the semifinals instead of the quarterfinals. The problem was resolved when the commissioners gave the Rose Bowl an ultimatum to accept no special treatment or be excluded from the new playoffs, with the bowl agreeing to forgo its demands.

2024 expansion 
The CFP will expand to a 12-team playoff for the 2024 season and beyond. Features of the enlarged playoff include:
 Guaranteed bids for the top six conference champions in the CFP rankings; no conference will have an automatic bid.
 At-large bids for the six highest-ranked remaining teams which could include additional conference champions.
 The four highest-ranked conference champions will receive first-round byes.
 The remaining teams will play each other in the first round at the home fields of the better seeds, matched in the standard format of 5–12, 6–11, 7–10, and 8–9.
 The quarterfinals and semifinals will be hosted by the New Year's Six, the Cotton Bowl, Fiesta Bowl, Orange Bowl, Peach Bowl, Rose Bowl, and Sugar Bowl on a rotating basis.
 The championship game will continue to be held at a separately determined neutral site.
 The playoff bracket would not be reseeded at any time.
 First round games will occur in December, quarterfinal games on or around New Year's Day, semifinal games at least one week later, and the championship game one week after the semifinals.

See also

College football playoff debate
College football national championships in NCAA Division I FBS
List of college bowl games
Mythical National Championship

References

External links

 

 
2014 establishments in the United States